Munir Ahmed Niazi, (9 April 1923– 26 December 2006) was an Punjabi and  Urdu poet from Pakistan. He also wrote for newspapers, magazines and radio. In 1960, he established a publication institute, Al-Misal. He was later associated with Pakistan Television, Lahore and lived in Lahore till his death.

Early life and career
Munir Ahmed Niazi was born on 9 April 1923, in a village in Hoshiarpur district, Punjab, British India. He was initially educated at Khanpur. After the partition of India in 1947, he migrated and settled in Sahiwal, where he passed his matriculation examination. He earned an intermediate degree from Sadiq Egerton College, Bahawalpur and a B.A. degree from Dayal Singh College, Lahore, Pakistan. Munir Niazi launched a weekly, Seven Colours, from Sahiwal in 1949. Some of his poetry was used in films and these film songs became popular super-hit songs among the Pakistani public which established him as one of the foremost movie songwriters of Pakistan in the 1960s. For example, the film song in film Shaheed (1962), Uss Bewafa Ka Shehar Hai Aur Hum Hain Dosto and many others. Munir Niazi was a proud Punjabi as Punjabi definition is cultural and geographical and most of his poetic expression was done in the Punjabi language.

Poetry that became super-hit film songs

Bibliography
Below are some of his Urdu publications:
Taiz Hawa Aur Tanha Phool 
Jungle Mein Dhanak
 Dushmanoon Kai Darmiyan Sham 
 Mah-e-Munir

In Punjabi language, he has published: 
Safar Di Raat 
Char Chup Cheezan  
Rasta Dassan Walay Tarey

Effective imagery in his poetry conveys pictures in a few words. He had experimented with poetic forms and had tried to create a new style, rhythm and diction in Urdu poetry. Innocence, mythology, nostalgia, dreams, eroticism, and romance are some of his most common themes. Selected English translations of Munir Niazi's poetical works were edited by Suhail Safdar and published in 1996.

Death and legacy
Munir Niazi died of respiratory illness on 26 December 2006 in Lahore, Pakistan.

On his 86th birth anniversary, a book titled 'Munir Niazi Ki Baatain, Yadain' was launched to honor him at the Punjab Institute of Language, Art and Culture (Pilac) at Lahore. This book has interviews of the late Munir Niazi and opinion columns about him.

Awards and recognition
Pride of Performance Award by the President of Pakistan in 1992 

Sitara-e-Imtiaz (Star of Excellence) Award by the President of Pakistan in 2005

References

1928 births
2006 deaths
Deaths from respiratory failure
People from Hoshiarpur
Poets from Lahore
Pakistani poets
Urdu-language poets from Pakistan
Recipients of Sitara-i-Imtiaz
Recipients of the Pride of Performance
People from Sahiwal
20th-century poets
Punjabi-language poets
Punjabi-language writers
Punjabi people
Pakistani songwriters